Geri Mewett (born 23 August 1974) is a Bermudian swimmer. He competed in three events at the 1992 Summer Olympics.

References

External links
 

1974 births
Living people
Bermudian male swimmers
Olympic swimmers of Bermuda
Swimmers at the 1992 Summer Olympics
Place of birth missing (living people)